The Scurlock Oil Company was an American oil company, with headquarters located in Houston, Texas.

History
Founded in 1936 by Eddy C. Scurlock, the company was a tank car marketer of petroleum products. It emerged as an important transporter of crude oil and natural-gas condensate.

By 1982, the Scurlock Oil Company was transporting  of oil a day by truck, barge, or pipeline.

Also in 1982, the Scurlock Oil Company was sold to Ashland Oil. When Ashland bought the Permian Corporation in 1991, it merged with Scurlock to form a subsidiary known as Scurlock Permian Corporation.

The Scurlock Permian Corporation subsidiary was sold to Plains All American Pipeline in 1999.

References

Defunct oil companies of the United States
Petroleum in Texas
Companies based in Houston
Energy companies established in 1936
Non-renewable resource companies established in 1936
Non-renewable resource companies disestablished in 1999
1936 establishments in Texas
1999 disestablishments in Texas
Defunct companies based in Texas
American companies established in 1936
American companies disestablished in 1999